Mahmoud El-Araby (1932 - September 9, 2021) was an Egyptian businessman and philanthropist. He founded ELARABY Group in 1964, a company that manufactures and trades home appliances and consumer electric products in Egypt and the Middle East.

Early life 
Mahmoud El-Araby was born in 1932 in Menoufia, Egypt.

Career 
In 1974, El-Araby obtained the selling rights for Toshiba products. In October 1980, Toshiba approved building a factory in Benha to partly manufacture and assemble their products. The Benha complex was completed in 1982. It was followed by the larger Quesna complex that has nine factories and three subsidized manufacturing plants. Later, El-Araby obtained selling and distribution rights from other companies, such as Sharp, Hitachi, Seiko Watch Corp., Sony, and NEC.

Personal life 
He had six sons and two daughters.

Death 
Mahmoud El-Araby died on September 9, 2021, at the age of 89.

References 

1932 births
2021 deaths
Egyptian businesspeople
People from Monufia Governorate
Recipients of the Order of the Rising Sun
Egyptians got it Order of the Rising Sun